Tunga may refer to:

Places
 Tunga, Leyte, a municipality in the Philippines
 Tunga River, a river in India
 The Gaelic name for the village of Tong, Lewis, in the Western Isles of Scotland
 The Gaelic name for the village of Tongue, Highland, in the northwest of Scotland
 Tunga Spur, a rock formation in Antarctica
 Tunka Suka or Tunga Suca, a mountain in Peru
 Tálknafjörður, a town formerly called Tunga, in Iceland

People
 Alp Er Tunga, a mythical hero in Turkish literature
 Michy Batshuayi Tunga, footballer
 Tunga (artist) (1952–2016), Brazilian sculptor and performance artist

Other uses
 Tunga (flea), a genus of burrowing fleas
 Tunga rakau or tunga haere, Maori names for huhu beetle larvae
 Battle of Tunga, or Battle of Lalsot in India in 1787